The 2016 edition of the AFL Youth Girls National Championships was held from 2 May to 6 May in Melbourne, Victoria. Nine teams competed in the round-robin tournament, divided into pool A: Queensland, Western Australia, Vic Country and Vic Metro; and pool B: the Northern Territory, South Australia, Tasmania, a combined New South Wales and Australian Capital Territory side (NSW/ACT) and the Indigenous Australian Woomeras.

A professional women's Australian rules football competition (AFL Women's (AFLW)) was to be inaugurated in 2017, creating a new incentive for performance in the championships. Several clubs who had received AFLW licences used the competition to scout potential players.

Vic Metro won pool A, completing an unbeaten tournament by holding Western Australia scoreless in the final played at the Melbourne Cricket Ground. NSW/ACT prevailed in pool B and was also undefeated in their group. Commenting on the pool A final, Herald Sun reporter Sam Edmund said "This is football as we remember it. No flooding, no pressing and players holding position. As good as the AFL has been this year, this was refreshing."

Fixtures

All-Australian team 
An initial All-Australian squad was named in May. Most of the squad appeared in an all-star game in September that acted as a curtain-raiser for the – Hampson-Hardeman Cup match. The final team was announced after the match. The selectors were Darren Flanigan, AFL Victoria female football manager and the chairman of the panel; Julia Price, former AFL Queensland female development manager; and footballers Lauren Arnell, Alicia Eva, Aasta O'Connor and Daisy Pearce.

References 

2016
2016 in Australian rules football
2016 in Australian women's sport